George "Yorkie" Shaw (1 April 1886 – 30 April 1971) was an Australian rules footballer who played with Fitzroy in the Victorian Football League (VFL) during the 1910s.

Football
At 164 cm, rover George Shaw was one of the smallest players in the game's history and kicked two goals in their 1913 Grand Final win against St Kilda. He also played in their premiership side in 1916, retiring in 1920 after playing 117 games for Fitzroy.

Following an unsuccessful pre-season trial with Richmond in 1922, Shaw took a position on the VFL field umpires list. Umpiring primarily in the Peninsula Football Association through 1922 and 1923, he was selected to umpire two VFL matches in August 1923, making his debut as a substitute for umpire Bob Scott, who was ill.

Death
He died at Fitzroy, Victoria on 30 April 1971.

References

External links

1886 births
1971 deaths
Australian rules footballers from Victoria (Australia)
Australian Rules footballers: place kick exponents
Fitzroy Football Club players
Fitzroy Football Club Premiership players
Two-time VFL/AFL Premiership players